Sarraut cabinet may refer to Albert Sarraut's 

 First Ministry, 26 October – 26 November 1933

 Second Ministry, 24 January – 4 June 1936

See also  
 History of France (1900–present)
 Interwar period#French Empire